Donald Merriam Allen (Iowa, 1912 – San Francisco, August 29, 2004) was an American editor, publisher and translator of American literature. He is best known for his project The New American Poetry 1945-1960 (1960), one of the anthologies of contemporary American writing he released.

Early life 
Allen began his working life as a Japanese translator within the US military, serving during WWII.

Career 
After his service ended, Allen became an editor at Grove Press, where he worked for 16 years. He was one of the first translators of the Romanian-French Absurdist playwright Eugène Ionesco, and Allen's 1958 volume Four Plays of Eugène Ionesco helped to introduce the playwright to American audiences in the 1960s.

Along with editing works by Lew Welch, Allen edited Frank O'Hara, including Collected Poems (1971; 1991) and Selected Poems (1974).  He is referred to directly in O'Hara's "Personal Poem" which is in Lunch Poems, a book Allen also edited. O'Hara writes, in reference to a conversation he had with LeRoi Jones, "we don't like Lionel Trilling/we decide, we like Don Allen." John Rechy records in his memoirs that Allen offered him the contract to publish City of Night.

In 1960, Allen moved from New York to San Francisco, where he established Grey Fox Press and the Four Seasons Foundation, two literary presses where he continued to publish works from Beat, San Francisco Renaissance, Black Mountain, and New York School writers. As the CEO of Grey Fox Press, he published works by Jack Spicer, along with Enough Said (1980) by Philip Whalen, and I Remain (1980), a collection of Welch's letters. Other authors published by Grey Fox Press included Richard Brautigan, Robert Duncan, Jack Kerouac, Joanne Kyger, Philip Lamantia, Charles Olson, John Rechy, Michael Rumaker, Aaron Shurin, and Gary Snyder.

Also in 1960, Allen edited the anthology The New American Poetry. In that book, released through Grey Fox Press, Allen included "Statements of Poetics," which was an experimental aesthetics discussion from Lawrence Ferlinghetti, Whalen, Snyder, Michael McClure, Jones, John Wieners, along with Kerouac and Allen Ginsberg.

While working with the Four Seasons Foundation, Allen also assisted in the publication of (among others): Interviews (1980) by Edward Dorn, A Quick Graph: Collected Notes and Essays (1970) by Robert Creeley, and The Graces (1983) by Aaron Shurin. In 1997, Allen helped edit, along with Benjamin Friedlander, the Collected Prose of Charles Olson (University of California Press).

Grey Fox Press 
Grey Fox Press and Four Seasons Foundation were among the many emerging presses that City Lights distributed in the late 1960s, and when Don Allen began thinking about retirement, City Lights offered to acquire the backlists. Today, City Lights publishes the significant works from these presses in their City Lights/Grey Fox series.

The Donald Allen Collection, processed in 1991 for a special collection series at the UC San Diego library, contains materials which Allen published through the Four Seasons Foundation and Grey Fox Press. The papers document Allen's editing and publishing works dating from 1957 to 1975, although some material is from the 1930s.

References

External links
Great Anthology: The New American Poetry: 1945-1960 article at "The Academy of American Poets" website
Whose New American Poetry? article by Marjorie Perloff
Tribute to Donald M. Allen at Empty Mirror Books website
Jacket Magazine tribute by Kevin Killian
Extensive Interview with Donald Allen
Donald Allen Collection MSS 3. Special Collections & Archives, UC San Diego Library.

1912 births
2004 deaths
Poets from Iowa
American book publishers (people)
Writers from the San Francisco Bay Area
20th-century American poets
American military personnel of World War II